Ronaldas Račinskas (born 13 May 1968) is a Lithuanian shotgun shooter.

He is a multiple Lithuanian champion in skeet, double trap and trap events. National record holder. In 2016 he was selected to represent Lithuania in 2016 Summer Olympics.

References

External links
 
 
 
 
 

1968 births
Living people
Lithuanian male sport shooters
Skeet shooters
Olympic shooters of Lithuania
Shooters at the 2016 Summer Olympics
European Games competitors for Lithuania
Shooters at the 2015 European Games
Shooters at the 2019 European Games
Sportspeople from Vilnius